Peter Gunn is an American private eye television series which aired on the NBC and later ABC television networks from 1958 to 1961. The show's creator (and also writer and director on occasion) was Blake Edwards. It was also directed by Boris Sagal, Robert Gist, Jack Arnold, Lamont Johnson, Robert Altman (one episode only), and several others. A total of 114 thirty-minute episodes were produced by Spartan Productions. Season one was filmed at Universal Studios, seasons two and three were filmed at Metro-Goldwyn-Mayer. Philip H. Lathrop and William W. Spencer were cinematographers on many episodes. Craig Stevens' wardrobe was tailored by Don Richards and Lola Albright's fashions by Emeson and by Jax.

Series overview
Peter Gunn ran for three seasons starting in late 1958. A total of 114 episodes were produced during the three-season run.

Episodes

Season 1 (1958–59)
Peter Gunn premiered on September 22, 1958, with the episode "The Kill". The first season ran from September 1958 through June 1959, and contained 38 episodes.

Season 2 (1959–60)
The second season premiered on September 21, 1959, with the episode "Protection". It ran from September 1959 through June 1960, and, like the first season, contained 38 episodes.

Season 3 (1960–61)
The third and final season premiered on October 3, 1960, with the episode "The Passenger". It ran from October 1960 through September 1961, and consisted of 38 episodes.

References

External links
 
 

Peter Gunn